SSBC TV (South Sudan Broadcasting Corporation Television) is a public television network in South Sudan which is owned and operated by the South Sudan Broadcasting Corporation.
SSBC TV broadcasts in English and Juba Arabic and can also be viewed on Satellite. The network runs a few small local TV stations in Aweil, Wau, Malakal and Rumbek. South Africa, China and Japan provided equipment and training for SSBC TV staff.

SSBC TV transmits via the Arabsat Badr-4 and Arabsat-5C satellite. SSBC TV broadcast hours are:

9:00 – 0:00 (Juba Time)
7:00 – 22:00 (UTC)

History

The chain began under the direction of self-government of South Sudan (made following a peace agreement in 2005) December 18, 2010 via satellite. After several months of its first issue, she was faced with a big problem: pay for transmission via Arabsat Badr 6 and Arab communications satellites ... because of the independence of this country. Useful to know that each country must pay rent for Arabsat to broadcast all its channels. However, the newly created Southern Sudan has not done since the beginning of the year, the channel is broadcast through the rent of his republic mother. The chain may be interrupted its broadcast programs from the satellite.

See also
Ebony TV
Media of South Sudan
Television in South Sudan

References

External links 
 Southern Sudan Television (SSTV) on Facebook

Television stations in South Sudan